Disco Defenders is Alcazar's third and final studio album. It was released on 11 March 2009 in Sweden, and internationally in May 2009. The album features two discs: "Now" (new Alcazar songs) and "Then" (featuring some of their older hits). The writers of the new songs include Anders Hansson, Pet Shop Boys, Danny Saucedo and Oscar Görres.

The album also includes a cover of the 1980 disco hit "Funkytown" by Lipps Inc.

Track listings

Standard edition

Special edition
This version is a re-release published the 18 November 2009 and includes two new tracks, "One Two Three Four" and "Last Christmas" instead of "Jump Straight into the Fire" and "Put the Top Down". This release has also a new cover.

Charts

Release history

References

2009 albums
Alcazar (band) albums